Lone Star College–Tomball (formerly Tomball College or TC) is one of six colleges in the Lone Star College System (LSCS) in Texas, USA.

The mailing address for the campus is 30555 Tomball Highway, Tomball, TX, 77375.

Facilities
In 1985, LSCS purchased  in northwest Tomball, Texas. A single megastructure was chosen as the design instead of building several different buildings. The basic design is a cruciform design with each of the four wings named after the compass direction that it points in, resulting in a North, South, East and West wing. Since then the college has grown in size. First the South Wing was expanded; several years later, the college went through a major expansion. In this expansion, the West wing was extended; however, the major work occurred in the East Wing, which greatly extended the size of the campus. In 2005, another expansion project was finished, during which time the library was moved and expanded to its current form as a joint project with Harris County. Also in the project, a Wellness Center, with dance studio, racquetball courts, basketball court, rock-climbing wall, indoor walking track, and various weight-lifting and exercise machines was opened in the North Wing.

Degrees and certificates offered
Lone Star College–Tomball offers the following degrees, among others:
Nursing
Occupational therapy
Cisco Certification (CCNA and CCNP)
Veterinary technology

Library
Lone Star College–Tomball and Community Library is a joint partnership with the [http://www.lonestar.edu/ Lone Star College System (LSCS)] and the [https://web.archive.org/web/20080511192154/http://www.hcpl.net/branchinfo/tb/tbinfo.htm Harris County Public Library system HCPL)].

Notes

External links
 Lone Star College-Tomball Home page

Tomball
Education in Harris County, Texas
Buildings and structures in Harris County, Texas